Jeypore Airport , also known as Jayapur Airport, is a domestic airport serving the cities of Jeypore and Koraput in Odisha, India. The airstrip was constructed in 1962 along with the establishment of a Hindustan Aeronautics Limited (HAL) factory nearby at Sunabeda. In the 1980s, Vayudoot operated a daily Bhubaneswar-bound flight via Visakhapatnam. Now, the new low-cost regional airline, IndiaOne Air, operates from the airport to Bhubaneswar and Vishakapatnam.

Development
In 2011, the state public works department (PWD) prepared a proposed to of around  6 crore to renovate the airstrip. The masterplan included upgrading the terminal building with modern facilities, widening of the apron, a wider approach road from the national highway and construction of a compound wall. In April 2013, the Government of Odisha began the process of acquiring more land in order to expand the airstrip. The task of expansion was handed over to the Roads and Buildings Department.

In October 2019, the State Government approached the Airports Authority of India (AAI) to prepare a Detailed Project Report (DPR) to upgrade the airport by extending the runway up to 1,200 m.

On October 20, 2022, the Directorate General of Civil Aviation (DGCA) granted Jeypore Airport the license to carry out commercial flight operations under the regional connectivity scheme.

On October 31, 2022, the regional airline carrier, IndiaOne Air, began direct flight services from the airport to Bhubaneswar.

Airlines and destinations

References

Airports in Odisha
Koraput district
Transport in Koraput
Airports established in 1962
1962 establishments in Orissa
20th-century architecture in India